Frank John Barron (August 6, 1890 – September 18, 1964) was a Major League Baseball pitcher. Barron played in one game for the Washington Senators on August 19, .

Barron attended West Virginia University, where he played college baseball for the Mountaineers from 1913–1914.

References

External links

1890 births
1964 deaths
Major League Baseball pitchers
West Virginia Mountaineers baseball players
Marietta Pioneers baseball players
Baseball players from West Virginia
Washington Senators (1901–1960) players
People from St. Marys, West Virginia